Friday the 13th Part VI: Jason Lives (stylized onscreen as Jason Lives: Friday the 13th Part VI) is a 1986 American slasher film written and directed by Tom McLoughlin, and starring Thom Mathews, Jennifer Cooke, David Kagen, and C.J. Graham. It is a sequel to Friday the 13th: A New Beginning (1985) and the sixth installment in the Friday the 13th franchise, being the last one to feature Tommy Jarvis (Mathews) as the protagonist. Continuing from the events of the previous film, the plot follows Tommy after he accidentally resurrects mass murderer Jason Voorhees (Graham) while attempting to destroy his body to ensure he will not return. While Jason returns to Crystal Lake for another killing spree, Tommy must overcome his fear of the masked killer that has haunted him for years, and find a way to stop him once and for all.

The original storyline had Tommy Jarvis become the series' new antagonist, but after the poor fan reception of A New Beginning, the producers instead brought Jason Voorhees back. In resurrecting Jason, McLoughlin made him an explicitly supernatural force for the first time in the series. This version of Jason, an undead and more powerful superhuman, would become the standard depiction for the rest of the series. The film also introduced metahumor, gothic horror, and action film elements, including shootouts and car chases, into the series.

Jason Lives was the first in the series to receive some positive reception from critics since the original. In the years since its release, its self-referential humor and numerous instances of breaking the fourth wall have been praised for prefiguring Kevin Williamson's Scream film series. Jason Lives is considered a fan favorite of the series, in addition to receiving positive notice from horror film historians. It grossed $19.4 million at the U.S. box office on a budget of $3 million. The film was followed by Friday the 13th Part VII: The New Blood in 1988.

Plot
Sometime after the events of the last film, Tommy Jarvis is released from the local Hospital for the Criminally Insane, despite still having hallucinations of the mass murderer Jason Voorhees, whom he killed in part 4. He returns to Crystal Lake, now renamed Forest Green, to confront his fears, alongside his friend Allen Hawes. The pair visit Jason's grave during a thunderstorm, hoping to cremate the killer's body and finally end Tommy's nightmares. After digging up Jason's corpse, Tommy experiences flashbacks of his last encounter with Jason. As he furiously impales Jason's body with a metal fence post, two lightning bolts strike the post, restoring Jason as a revenant with superhuman strength. After killing Hawes, Jason dons his hockey mask (which Tommy has brought along with him). Tommy flees to the sheriff's office; there he attempts to warn the police of Jason's return, only to be arrested and jailed by Sheriff Mike Garris, who is aware of Tommy's institutionalization. Sheriff Garris presumes that Tommy is hallucinating Jason's return. On the road, camp counselors Darren Robinson and Lizabeth Mott get lost looking for Camp Forest Green. They discover Jason, who murders them both.

The following morning, Garris' daughter Megan - a striking blonde with a wild streak - arrives at his station, along with her friends Sissy Baker, Cort Andrews, and Paula Mott. The four teenagers report Darren and Lizabeth missing. Tommy warns them about Jason, who is now considered an urban legend. Megan doesn't know whether to believe Tommy, although she does find herself attracted to him. In the woods, Jason happens upon a corporate paintball game; he decapitates three players, crushes a fourth player's face into a tree, and dismembers the fifth player. He also commandeers a machete from the players.

As children arrive at Camp Forest Green, the teen counselors do their best to run the camp, still wondering what has happened to Darren and Lizabeth. Meanwhile, Sheriff Garris opts for transferring Tommy out of his jurisdiction, due to Tommy's influence on Megan. On the way out of town, Tommy makes a run for Jason's grave, which the caretaker has covered up to deny responsibility for the grave being robbed. Hawes' body is buried in Jason's place. A handcuffed Tommy is escorted out of town by the Sheriff, who warns him to never return. That night, Jason butchers the caretaker, along with a nearby couple who happen to witness the murder. Meanwhile, Cort meets with a girl named Nicola Parsley; as the teen couple make out, Jason kills them both. When the sheriff's men find Nicola's and Cort's bodies, Garris promptly implicates Tommy in the double murder, convinced that Tommy's "delusions" regarding Jason have driven him berserk.

Tommy contacts Megan for help luring Jason back to Crystal Lake and she agrees. Meanwhile, Jason makes his way to the camp. He kills both Sissy and Paula but refrains from harming the children. Elsewhere, Tommy and Megan are pulled over by Sheriff Garris. Although his daughter points out that Tommy has been with her for the past few hours, and therefore could not have murdered Cort and Nicola, the sheriff locks Tommy up anyway, telling Megan he'll decide what to do with her later. Then Garris and two of his deputies head out for the camp to arrest Tommy's (nonexistent) "other accomplice"; instead, all three lawmen are slain by Jason. Megan breaks Tommy out of jail and they rush to the camp. 

Jason is about to kill Megan when Tommy calls to him from a boat out on the lake; remembering his killer, Jason goes after Tommy instead. Tommy chains a boulder around Jason's neck, trapping him underwater, but Jason demolishes the boat and drags him beneath the lake's surface. When Megan dives in to rescue Tommy, Jason grabs her leg; she runs the monster through with the boat's outboard motor. Megan swims Tommy back to shore and revives him via CPR. Tommy says that Jason is finally home. 

Jason is shown to be still alive - albeit anchored to the lake's floor - waiting for another opportunity to return.

Cast

 Thom Mathews as Tommy Jarvis
 Jennifer Cooke as Megan Garris
 C.J. Graham as Jason Voorhees
 David Kagen as Sheriff Mike Garris
 Kerry Noonan as Paula Mott
 Renée Jones as Elizabeth "Sissy" Baker
 Tom Fridley as Carter "Cort" Andrews
 Darcy DeMoss as Nicola "Nikki" Parsley
 Nancy McLoughlin as Lizbeth Mott
 Tony Goldwyn as Darren Robinson
 Alan Blumenfeld as Larry
 Matthew Faison as Stan
 Ann Ryerson as Katie
 Ron Palillo as Allen Hawes
 Vincent Guastaferro as Deputy Rick Cologne
 Michael Swan as Officer Pappas
 Courtney Vickery as Nancy
 Whitney Rydbeck as Roy
 Bob Larkin as Martin
 Wallace Merck as Burt
 Roger Rose as Steven Halavex
 Cynthia Kania as Annette Edwards
 Michael Nomad as Officer Thornton
 Justin Nowell as Billy
 Tommy Nowell as Tyen
 Dan Bradley as Jason Voorhees (Paintball scene, uncredited)

Production

Pre-production and writing
Although the previous film in the series, Friday the 13th: A New Beginning, had been a financial success, it had disappointed the series' fans and received some of the worst reviews of any film in the series. In order to prevent further alienating the fans (and thus potentially endangering the series), the producers decided to take the series in a new direction, moving it away from what producer Frank Mancuso Jr. called the "coarse" nature of A New Beginning.

To this end, Mancuso hired Tom McLoughlin, who had directed the successful horror film One Dark Night but was also known around Hollywood for shopping around various comedy scripts he had written, a dichotomy that appealed to Mancuso. McLoughlin was given free rein on how he would present the story, with the only condition being that he bring back Jason and make him the film's villain.

McLoughlin decided to take the film in the direction of an old Universal Monsters movie, specifically the 1931 version of Frankenstein, which portrayed the monster as a lumbering killer brought to life by electricity. McLoughlin also drew from vampire lore in order to give Jason a weakness, namely being returned to his "home soil"; to achieve this, McLoughlin disregarded the idea presented in Part 2 that Jason had survived his drowning, instead presenting the idea that Jason has always been some sort of supernatural force. He also decided to retcon the ending of the fifth film, where Tommy Jarvis was a serial killer. In fact, Pam's truck from the fifth film can be seen indicating she is alive. In the "Tommy Tapes" for Friday the 13th: The Game (2017) written by Adam Green, it's explained that the ending of the fifth film was Tommy's dream.

McLoughlin further decided to expand the series' thematic scope, incorporating action film elements and postmodern metahumor; when Jason is first encountered in the woods near Crystal Lake, the character Lizbeth comments that she and Darren should flee because she knows about proper conduct to survive a horror film. McLoughlin would further satirize the series itself, as Martin the gravedigger comments on Jason's exhumation, "Why'd they have to go and dig up Jason?" before breaking the fourth wall and addressing the camera with the observation, "Some folks sure got a strange idea of entertainment." In addition to Frankenstein, McLoughlin also cited as inspiration his love of Gothic horror, particularly the works of Edgar Allan Poe, and his Catholic upbringing; Jason Lives features the series' only explicit references to God, and during the climax a praying girl is spared by Jason (a similar scene, in which the same girl prays for Tommy while Megan performs CPR, then mouths "Thank you" while looking skyward was deleted from the final cut of the movie, apparently against McLoughlin's wishes; he recalled in the 2009 DVD's director's commentary, "Somehow it didn't stay in... probably too much sentiment").

Casting
The decision to retcon the events of Part V resulted in many members of that film's cast—whose characters had survived—having their contracts to return for a sequel terminated. At one point in time when Jason Lives was being considered as a direct sequel to A New Beginning rather than to The Final Chapter, the surviving characters Pam and Reggie from A New Beginning were to have died in the film's opening moments.

Although Mancuso retained control over the film's casting, he deferred to McLoughlin's judgment; the only caveat was that the final girl had to be a "very attractive blonde". To fulfill this requirement, McLoughlin chose Jennifer Cooke, based on her performance in the television series V. The role of Hawes, Tommy's would-be sidekick who dies within the first five minutes of the movie, was given to another television veteran, Ron Palillo, famous for the role of Horshack on Welcome Back, Kotter.

John Shepherd was asked to reprise his role as Tommy Jarvis from the previous film. Shepherd, an evangelical Christian who had reservations about returning to the series based on the atmosphere surrounding A New Beginning, was attracted to Jason Lives based on the scene in which a praying girl is spared by Jason. He ultimately decided to film Caught and shortly thereafter retired from acting to go to seminary. Thom Matthews, who would take over the mantel of Tommy Jarvis, was chosen for his work in the horror comedy Return of the Living Dead, although McLoughlin himself was unaware of Matthews' horror credentials until after shooting began. Other cast members were actors who McLoughlin had directed before (such as David Kagen, who was also an acting teacher for female lead Jennifer Cooke) and McLoughlin's own family—Jason's first female victim in the film, Lizbeth, was played by McLoughlin's wife, Nancy. In keeping with the series' tradition, the role of Jason was given to a stuntman, Dan Bradley. Bradley, however, was replaced shortly thereafter by C. J. Graham. Bradley's involvement during the paintball scene is kept.

Filming
After the first day of filming, Mancuso decided that he disliked Bradley's appearance onscreen as Jason. Although the scenes that Bradley filmed—in which Jason kills the paintball playing executives—were kept in the completed picture, the rest of Jason's scenes were performed by C. J. Graham, an area restaurant manager and former soldier. As part of a stage show put on at the restaurant, a magician would hypnotize audience members and place them in a scenario during which they encountered Jason Voorhees; Graham, who stood 6'3 and weighed 250 lbs, was asked to play Jason for the scenario. Jason Lives special effects coordinator, Martin Becker, was in the audience for one such show, and recommended Graham to Mancuso and McLoughlin. Both men were impressed with Graham's presence, and he was hired to film the remainder of Jason's scenes.

Jason Lives is the only film in the franchise to contain no nudity; the characters in the film's sole sex scene are both fully clothed, a conscious move on McLoughlin's part to distance the Friday the 13th films from their perception as morality tales in which premarital sex is punished by death. McLoughlin was pressured by the film's producers to have Darcy Demoss remove her shirt during the RV sex scene, but he only suggested the idea to Demoss, who refused.

Jason Lives was filmed in Covington, Georgia, an area close to Atlanta. The scenes involving the police department and town were filmed in Covington, while the camp scenes were filmed at Camp Daniel Morgan outside the city limits of Covington. In the film, Camp Crystal Lake has been renamed Lake Forest Green. Surrounding Camp Daniel Morgan are Smokey the Bear signs asking everyone to "Keep the Forests Green".

Some of the climactic moments in the lake were actually filmed in the swimming pool of McLoughlin's father. McLoughlin ruined the pool's filter in the process (it was jammed by gore churned into the water when Jason is hit with the boat propeller).

Post-production
McLoughlin's attempt to deliver a "different" kind of Friday the 13th film were met with skepticism from the producers. In contrast to the series' other entries, which had to be edited for violence in order to avoid an "X" rating, the film's producers requested that McLoughlin add more gore, violence, and murders to the film. The original cut of the film contained 13 killings as an in-joke; in order to appease the studio, McLoughlin had to add an additional three killings, bringing the total up to 16. These were the killings of Martin the gravedigger, and the recently engaged couple on a nighttime picnic. McLoughlin later said he felt the shot in which the picnicking man realizes that he's been spotted by Jason to be the film's scariest moment.

Additionally, McLoughlin was made to extend Sissy's death, adding the shots of Jason dragging her to the ground and twisting her head off; as originally filmed, Sissy was simply pulled out of the cabin window, and wasn't seen again until Megan finds her head in the squad car.

McLoughlin also found himself in contention with the producers over how the film should end. In the original script, the movie was supposed to have concluded in the graveyard, with Martin the gravedigger meeting Jason's father, Elias—a heretofore unseen character in the series—with the implication that Elias knows Jason has been resurrected and has come looking for him. The studio balked at the scene, as they did not want the responsibility of having to introduce Elias' backstory in the next installment. Additionally, the added murder of Martin made the scene a continuity error. This ending would have tied up a continuity error from A New Beginning, when it is mentioned that Jason was cremated. A deleted scene from Jason Lives had Tommy asking Sheriff Garris why Jason wasn't cremated, as had been planned, at which point Garris informs him that someone paid the city to bury Jason; Elias' handing Martin a wad of money would have indicated that he was the man who paid for Jason's burial. The scene was later storyboarded for inclusion on the film's "Deluxe Edition" DVD release, with Bob Larkin reprising his role as Martin to provide voiceover. Elias, like Jason, was scripted to be completely silent.

McLoughlin ultimately shot three endings, two of which were not included on the film's DVD release. In one ending, Jason's mask floats to the surface of Crystal Lake, having become detached during his struggle with Megan. In another, Deputy Cologne tries to reach the jail cell keys after having been locked in by Tommy and Megan; the door to the police station opens and the film abruptly ends, indicating that Jason managed to get free. The producers disliked both of these endings, as each one left Jason's survival ambiguous, and wanted it explicitly shown onscreen that he was still capable of returning for a sequel. As a result, McLoughlin shot the film's used ending, showing a closeup of Jason's open, twitching eye.

Music

The film's music was composed by Harry Manfredini, who composed the scores to all of the series' previous installments. In addition to the original score, the soundtrack also featured:
 "He's Back (The Man Behind the Mask)" by Alice Cooper, from his album Constrictor
 "I'm No Animal" by Felony, from their album Vigilante
 "Teenage Frankenstein" by Alice Cooper, from his album Constrictor
 "Hard Rock Summer" by Alice Cooper, from the box set The Life and Crimes of Alice Cooper

"He's Back (The Man Behind the Mask)" had an accompanying music video, combining clips from the film with new footage featuring Cooper.

On January 13, 2012, La-La Land Records released a limited edition 6-CD boxset containing Manfredini's scores from the first six Friday the 13th films. It sold out in less than 24 hours.

Reception

Box office
Friday the 13th Part VI: Jason Lives opened on August 1, 1986, in 1,610 theaters and grossed $6.7 million in its opening weekend, ranking number two at the US box office. Ultimately, it would go on to gross a total of $19.4 million, ranking at number 46 on the list of the year's top earners.

Critical response
On the review aggregator website Rotten Tomatoes, Friday the 13th Part VI: Jason Lives holds an approval rating of 50% based on 30 reviews, with an average rating of 5.10/10. The site's critics consensus reads: "Friday the 13th: Part VI - Jason Lives indeed brings back ol' Voorhees, along with a sense of serviceable braindead fun." On Metacritic, it has a weighted average score of 30 out of 100, based on 10 critics, indicating "generally unfavorable reviews." Audiences polled by CinemaScore gave the film an average grade of "B" on an A+ to F scale.

Variety described the film as predictable but "reasonably slick". Caryn James of The New York Times called it "a gory waste of time", citing numerous logic problems and stating that McLoughlin's injecting humor into the series, while successful, was not enough to liven up the predictability of the story. Gene Siskel of the Chicago Tribune similarly judged that while the film's self-referential humor was good enough to make it the best film in the series, it was not enough to take away from the story being essentially the same as in the previous five installments. He gave it 1 1/2 stars.

In a 2012 retrospective review, Ken Hanke of Mountain Xpress wrote that it "may not be exactly a good movie in the strict sense, but it's easily the best in the series", noting that he had seen all ten installments which had been released at the time. David Nusair said the film has "probably the most effective pre-credits sequence in the entire franchise ... just the sort of appreciatively ludicrous interlude that's generally been sorely missing from this pervasively dull series". However, he felt the bulk of the film, while an improvement over the previous two installments, suffered from tedious pacing and a lack of gore. He gave it two out of four stars, the same rating he gave to six out of the series' ten installments.

Other media

Novelization
A novelization of Friday the 13th Part VI: Jason Lives was written by Simon Hawke in 1986; notably, the novelization features an appearance by a Mr. Voorhees, Jason's father who was originally meant to appear in the film but was cut. The book also includes various flashbacks to Jason's childhood and the backstories of characters such as Tommy and Sheriff Garris are also expanded.

References

External links

 
 
 
 
 Film page at the Camp Crystal Lake web site
 Film page at Fridaythe13thfilms.com

Friday Part 6
1986 films
1986 horror films
American sequel films
American slasher films
1980s English-language films
Films directed by Tom McLoughlin
Films scored by Harry Manfredini
Films set in 1990
Films set in New Jersey
Films shot in Georgia (U.S. state)
Jason Lives
Paramount Pictures films
Resurrection in film
Films about summer camps
Supernatural slasher films
Films with screenplays by Tom McLoughlin
Films about father–daughter relationships
1980s American films